Dukla Olomouc was a professional basketball club based in Olomouc, the historical capital city of Moravia. The team was the basketball department of the military multi-sport club VTJ Dukla Olomouc.

Honours
Total Titles: 2

Domestic competitions
Czechoslovak Championship
Winners (2): 1973, 1975

Basketball teams in the Czech Republic